St. David's Episcopal Church is a parish of the Episcopal Diocese of Pennsylvania in the Manayunk neighborhood of Philadelphia, Pennsylvania. It is part of the Wissahickon Deanery of the Diocese of Pennsylvania. In 1960, the parish reported 621 members; it reported 37 members in 2019. English-born mill-workers were heavily represented in its early population, while mill owners were successive wardens, vestrymen, and treasurers.

The first church building designed by architect John Notman was completed in 1835 and destroyed by fire on December 23, 1879. The first rector was the Rev. Frederick Freeman, who served from 1835 to 1839. The current brownstone building was consecrated on December 26, 1881 by Bishop William Bacon Stevens after the laying of its cornerstone by the same bishop on May 15, 1880. It was inscribed on the Philadelphia Register of Historic Places on March 8, 2019.

The sanctuary is designed for ad orientem liturgical celebration, which has been practiced practiced occasionally since the 1970s. The high altar was designed by the studio of English Gothic revival architect George Frederick Bodley and completed by the firm of Cram and Ferguson Architects. It was dedicated and blessed on October 31, 1919 by Bishop Philip M. Rhinelander in memory of Orlando Crease, warden of the parish for 56 years and Sunday school superintendent from 1853 to 1913.

In 1886, the church installed a four-face tower clock by the E. Howard Watch and Clock Company with six-foot diameter faces striking on an E-flat bell and weighing 2,500 pounds. The clock-face is a popular Manayunk landmark and was the object of a 2007 restoration campaign.

The parish had a separate chapel on Terrace Street in Manayunk until 1886. By 1889, St. David's had a surpliced male choir, indicating a somewhat High Church worship orientation. In 1919, the church abandoned pew-rents.

St. David's was instrumental in the founding of at least three local daughter parishes through its Sunday schools: Church of St. Alban, Roxborough, St. Timothy's Episcopal Church, Roxborough, and the former St. Stephen's, Wissahickon (demolished 1975).

Notable people
Benjamin Wistar Morris, second Bishop of the Episcopal Diocese of Oregon, rector 1850-1856
Walter C. Righter (1923-2011), baptized and raised at St. David's. Bishop of the Episcopal Diocese of Iowa (1972-1988), assistant bishop for the Episcopal Diocese of Newark from 1989 to 1991. Righter was formally charged with heresy in 1995 for ordaining a non-celibate gay man to the diaconate, and acquitted on May 15, 1996 after an ecclesiastical trial.

See also 
Church of St. Alban, Roxborough
St. Timothy's Episcopal Church, Roxborough
St. Peter's Episcopal Church of Germantown

References
Edward S. Hale, "St. David's, Manayunk," Philadelphia Church News, 1916.
100th Anniversary of St. David's Episcopal Church, Manayunk, Philadelphia: 1831-1931
Hundred and Fiftieth Anniversary Booklet of St. David’s Church, Manayunk (1981)
John C. Manton, The Grand Old Lady of Manayunk: The Victorian Legacy of Saint David's Church (1981)
James Proud, From the Annals of St. David's, Manayunk (2006)

External links
Official website
Churchyard directory from Find a Grave
Lithograph of Notman church c. 1840 from the Library Company of Philadelphia
Leaflet for the Laying of the Cornerstone at St. David’s Church, Manayunk (1880) from Philadelphia Studies
Study of the Episcopal Diocese of Pennsylvania: St. David’s Church, Manayunk (1964) from Philadelphia Studies
Philadelphia Register of Historic Places Petition (2019)

1831 establishments in Pennsylvania
Churches in Philadelphia
Episcopal Church in Pennsylvania
Religious organizations established in 1831
19th-century Episcopal church buildings